Wood-Ridge (formerly known as Woodridge–Moonachie) is an NJ Transit rail station on the Pascack Valley Line. The station is in Wood-Ridge, New Jersey and is located at Park Place East, near the intersection of Route 17.

History
The station originates back to the 1860s as part of the Hackensack and New York Railroad. The station at Wood-Ridge was soon replaced by a larger building on the opposite side of the tracks until 1967, when a widening of Route 17 caused the need to demolish the station depot. Along with Wood-Ridge, Carlstadt, Hasbrouck Heights and Williams Avenue stations were all demolished.

Until 2016, the Wood-Ridge station was the only one to serve the town. This changed when the Wesmont station serving the Bergen County Line opened near Wood-Ridge's border with Wallington.

Station layout
The station has one track and one low-level side platform.

References

External links

 Station from Moonachie Avenue from Google Maps Street View

NJ Transit Rail Operations stations
Former Erie Railroad stations
Railway stations in Bergen County, New Jersey
Wood-Ridge, New Jersey
Railway stations in the United States opened in 1861
1861 establishments in New Jersey